Live is the first live album by French singer Vanessa Paradis, released on 28 February 1994 by Remark Records. The album was recorded on her Natural High Tour, on 21 April 1993 and is unique for featuring a large number of English songs when compared to her other live albums and tours.

Track listing

CD and cassette
 "Natural High" – 4:59 (Lenny Kravitz; album Vanessa Paradis, 1992)
 "Les Cactus" – 2:47 (Jacques Lanzmann, Jacques Dutronc; no album material)
 "Marilyn & John" – 4:10 (Étienne Roda-Gil, Franck Langolff; M&J, 1988)
 "As Tears Go By" – 4:00 (Mick Jagger, Keith Richards; no album material)
 "Tandem" 3:46 (Serge Gainsbourg, Langolff; Variations sur le même t'aime, 1990)
 "Dis-lui toi que je t'aime" – 4:24 (Gainsbourg, Langolff; Variations sur le même t'aime)
 "Joe le Taxi" – 4:16 (Roda-Gil, Langolff; M&J)
 "La Vague à lames" – 4:32 (Gainsbourg, Langolff; Variations sur le même t'aime)
 "Maxou" – 4:29 (Roda-Gil, Langolff; M&J)
 "Sunday Mondays" – 3:48 (Henry Hirsch, Kravitz, Paradis; Vanessa Paradis)
 "Silver And Gold" – 2:46 (Kravitz; Vanessa Paradis)
 "Gotta Have It" – 2:31 (Hirsch, Kravitz, Craig Ross; Vanessa Paradis)
 "Lonely Rainbows" – 2:34 (Hirsch, Kravitz; Vanessa Paradis)
 "I'm Waiting for the Man" – 3:31 (Lou Reed; Vanessa Paradis)
 "Be My Baby" – 3:50 (Gerry DeVeaux, Kravitz; Vanessa Paradis)
 "Just as Long as You Are There" – 6:00 (Hirsch, Kravitz; Vanessa Paradis)
Source: skamelot.free.fr

LP
Side A
 "Natural High" – 4:59
 "Les Cactus" – 2:47
 "Marilyn & John" – 4:10
 "As Tears Go By" – 4:00
 "Tandem" 3:46
 "Dis-lui toi que je t'aime" – 4:24
 "Joe le Taxi" – 4:16
Side B
 "La Vague à lames" – 4:32
 "Sunday Mondays" – 3:48
 "Silver And Gold" – 2:46
 "Gotta Have It" – 2:31
 "Lonely Rainbows" – 2:34
 "I'm Waiting for the Man" – 3:31
 "Be My Baby" – 3:50
Source: skamelot.free.fr

Personnel
Reg Webb – keyboards
Jack Petruzzelli – guitar
Anthony Wilson – guitar
Osama Afifi – bass guitar
Zoro – drums
Butch Thomas – saxophone
Sandy Bougouneau – backing vocals
Derin Young – backing vocals

Design
Claude Gassian – photography
Nathalie Baylaucq – cover design

Charts

References

1994 live albums
Albums recorded at the Olympia (Paris)
Live albums by French artists
Vanessa Paradis albums